Pattathanam is a residential area in the city of Kollam in Kerala, southwest India. It is home to various educational institutions. Subrahmanya Swami Temple, where annual elephant festival (Pattathanam Gajamela) is held is located here. The Latin Catholic(RCLC) Bharata Rajni Church, Ammannada Ardhanarishvara temple (Family temple of Kaliyilil puthen veedu earlier and presently run by NSS), St. John's Marthoma Church, St. Thomas CSI Church are located in Pattathanam.

Schools and colleges
Schools and colleges located in the area include Vimala Hridaya Catholic Girls High School, Krist Raj Boys High School, Balika Mariyam LPS, Fatima Mata National College and Bishop Jerome College of Engineering.

Notable individuals

Notable individuals born in Pattathanam include:
Suresh Babu, Olympian
Babu Divakaran, politician and former Kerala minister
Dr A. V. George, member of Kerala State Commission for Backward Classes
Mukesh, actor and producer
Sreeni Pattathanam, rationalist writer
Vidhu Vincent, filmmaker and writer

External links
Kerala Sustainable Urban Development Project Final Report, Volume 5 Part II Section B Kollam

Neighbourhoods in Kollam